Stewart Henderson (born 5 June 1947) is a Scottish former footballer who played in the Football League for Brighton & Hove Albion and Reading as a full back.

References

1947 births
Living people
People from Bridge of Allan
Scottish footballers
Association football defenders
Chelsea F.C. players
Brighton & Hove Albion F.C. players
Reading F.C. players
English Football League players